George W. Van Cleaf (October 8, 1879 – January 6, 1905) was an American water polo player and swimmer who represented the United States at the 1904 Summer Olympics in St. Louis, Missouri.  At the 1904 Olympics, Van Cleaf was sponsored by the New York Athletic Club.  He won a gold medal as a member of the New York Athletic Club's Olympic water polo team, and was also a member of the NYAC's fourth-place team in the men's 4x50-yard freestyle relay. In 1988, he was inducted into the USA Water Polo Hall of Fame.

References

External links
 

1879 births
1905 deaths
American male water polo players
Olympic gold medalists for the United States in swimming
Olympic medalists in water polo
Olympic water polo players of the United States
Water polo players at the 1904 Summer Olympics
Medalists at the 1904 Summer Olympics
Swimmers at the 1904 Summer Olympics